The Men's Shot Put event at the 2001 World Championships in Edmonton, Alberta, Canada was held on Saturday August 4, 2001. There were a total number of 30 participating athletes, with the qualification mark set at 20.45 metres.

Doping 
Andrey Mikhnevich of Belarus tested positive for Human chorionic gonadotropin during the championships and his results were subsequently disqualified.

Medalists

Schedule
All times are Mountain Standard Time (UTC-7)

Abbreviations
All results shown are in metres

Records

Qualification

Group A

Group B

Final

See also
2001 Shot Put Year Ranking
2002 European Championships

References

 Results
 IAAF

Shot Put
Shot put at the World Athletics Championships